Franco Pancheri (born January 25, 1958 in Travagliato) is an Italian professional football coach and a former player.

Honours
 Serie A champion: 1979/80.

1958 births
Living people
Italian footballers
Serie A players
Serie B players
Inter Milan players
Como 1907 players
Udinese Calcio players
U.S. Cremonese players
A.C. Cesena players
Italian football managers
FCI Levadia Tallinn managers
Expatriate football managers in Estonia
Association football defenders
S.F. Aversa Normanna players
Italian expatriate football managers
Italian expatriate sportspeople in Estonia